Francisco de Paula Aguirre (October 20, 1875 – 1939) was a Venezuelan composer. He wrote many popular waltzes; his most important works include "Claveles de Galipán", "Que bellas son las flores", "Dama Antañona" and the joropo "Amalia".  He died in 1939.

References

External links

See also 
Venezuela
Venezuelan music

1875 births
1939 deaths
Musicians from Caracas
Venezuelan composers
Male composers
Venezuelan folk musicians